Polbo is a rock en Español band from Puerto Rico. Its members are Jorge Colón (vocals), Alberto Colón (guitar, vocals), Harold Sanders (guitar), Eric de la Cruz (drums), and Josean Rosario (bass). Their debut album was nominated at the Latin Grammy Awards of 2006 for Best Rock Album.

Discography
Polbo (2006)
Limonada (2009)

See also
 Puerto Rican rock

References

External links
Official website 
[ Allmusic.com review of Polbo] 
Pulso Rock: Bandas - Polbo 

Puerto Rican musical groups
Rock en Español music groups
1998 establishments in Puerto Rico
Musical groups established in 1998